Black Breath is an American heavy metal band from Washington that formed in Bellingham in 2006 and later moved to Seattle. They play hardcore punk-influenced extreme metal. A key factor of their sound is the "Boss HM-2 Heavy Metal Pedal", which was popularized by bands such as Entombed, Dismember and Edge of Sanity in the early 1990s.

History 
Black Breath began in 2005, playing local bars and house shows in Bellingham. They released a few demos, and toured the underground before finally recording an actual EP in 2008. In 2008 they released the Razor to Oblivion EP under their own label, Hot Mass Records. The EP gained attention in the local music underground and the band signed with Southern Lord Records, a Los Angeles based metal and hardcore punk oriented label, in October 2009. Black Breath toured across the country to support the EP as a support act for Victims, Rise and Fall, and Trap Them. Southern Lord then took over the distribution of the EP, which was re-released under the new label, and Black Breath went to the east coast to record their debut album, Heavy Breathing, at GodCity Studios, owned by Converge guitarist Kurt Ballou. Heavy Breathing was released on March 30, 2010, by Southern Lord. Their second album titled Sentenced To Life was released March 27, 2012, also on Southern Lord Records.
In October 2014 it was announced that Black Breath would be returning to GodCity Studios to record their follow up, Slaves Beyond Death, for an early 2015 release. Elijah Nelson, the band's bassist, was found dead on December 29, 2019.

Discography
 Razor to Oblivion EP (2008)
 Heavy Breathing (2010)
 Sentenced to Life (2012)
 Slaves Beyond Death (2015)

Music videos
 Home of the Grave (2012)

References

External links 
 

Musical groups from Seattle
American thrash metal musical groups
American sludge metal musical groups
Heavy metal musical groups from Washington (state)
Hardcore punk groups from Washington (state)